Sydney Ice Arena was an ice sports and public ice skating centre, located in Norwest, New South Wales. It hosted a number of major events, including Australian Ice Hockey League games.

A development application was submitted by property owner Hillsong, seeking to demolish the arena to make way for apartment blocks with retail facilities, and was approved by council. Demolition of the arena was scheduled to begin on October 24, 2017.

Facilities 
The arena contained an ice hockey rink which was also used for other ice-based sports and general ice-skating by the public and school groups. There was also a large stand of seating along one side of the arena for spectators, with the addition of other seating in other locatio

ns. Other facilities included a kiosk, cafe, ice-skating shop and hire shop.

Events

See also

List of ice rinks in Australia

References

External links
 

Ice hockey venues in Australia
Sports venues in Sydney
Indoor arenas in Australia
Figure skating venues in Australia
Speed skating venues in Australia